The New York City Campaign Finance Board (CFB) is an independent New York City agency that serves to provide campaign finance information to the public, enable more citizens to run for office by granting public matching funds, increase voter participation and awareness, strengthen the role of small contributors, and reduce the potential for actual or perceived corruption.

The agency's history dates back to the mid-1980s, when New York City Mayor Ed Koch introduced a series of ethics reforms in response to several high-profile corruption scandals. These reforms included the Campaign Finance Act, which was adopted on February 29, 1988, by the New York City Council. In 1988, the New York City Charter Revision Commission proposed and passed a public referendum that established the Campaign Finance Board.

The CFB was established with the mission of reducing the influence of large private contributions in the political process. The voluntary Campaign Finance Program provides matching funds to qualifying candidates for mayor, public advocate, comptroller, borough president, and City Council.

Structure and appointment process 

The board is composed of five members who serve staggered five-year terms. Board members may be reappointed and are not subject to term limits. Two are appointed by the mayor, and two are appointed by the speaker of the City Council. The Chair is appointed by the mayor after consultation with the speaker. Historically, the board has been composed of attorneys, academics, and civic and faith leaders. The founding board members appointed in April 1988 were: Rev. Joseph A. O'Hare, S.J., James I. Lewis, Frank J. Macchiarola, Robert B. McKay, and Sonia Sotomayor.

The current board as of 2018 is:

 Frederick Schaffer, Chair (appointed by Mayor Bill de Blasio on March 1, 2017, through November 30, 2018)
 Gregory T. Camp (appointed by former City Council Speaker Melissa Mark-Viverito on March 28, 2017, through November 30, 2021)
 Richard J. Davis (appointed by former City Council Speaker Christine Quinn in June 2009, reappointed by former Council Speaker Mark-Viverito on December 1, 2014, through November 30, 2019)
 Marianne Spraggins (appointed by Mayor Bill de Blasio on February 26, 2018, through November 30, 2022)
 Naomi B. Zauderer (appointed on February 27, 2016, through November 30, 2020)

The Campaign Finance Act 

The Board administers the Campaign Finance Act, which applies to every candidate running for mayor, public advocate, comptroller, borough president, and City Council member in New York City. Candidates are required to disclose where their contributions come from and how they are spent. The Board collects this information throughout the election cycle and makes it public on its website.  Candidates must abide by contributions limits and restrictions, including “Doing Business” restrictions aimed at reducing the perception of “pay-to-play” politics in local government.

The CFB audits every campaign for these offices to ensure compliance with the law.
In order to qualify for receiving public funds, candidates are required to meet a two-part threshold. The Campaign Finance Program matches eligible donations 6:1, but there are limits to the maximum public funds that a candidate may receive.

The CFB is authorized by the Campaign Finance Act to conduct investigations either on its own initiative or following receipt of a complaint into possible violations of the City Charter, the Campaign Finance Act, or any of its related rules. The CFB also conducts field investigations and desk and field audits. Furthermore, the CFB has authority to issue subpoenas, take sworn testimony, and issue document requests and interrogatories.  The investigatory powers of the CFB as an independent agency contrast with the New York City Conflicts of Interest Board, for example, which, under the City Charter, turns to the New York City Department of Investigation for assistance with probes.

The Campaign Finance Program 

The Campaign Finance Program has evolved considerably since 1988, based in part on legislative changes recommended by the Board in its post-election reports.

The voluntary Program helps credible candidates run competitive campaigns by providing funds for contributions received by NYC residents. The matching rate has changed over time; from $1–$1 up to $1,000 per contributor, to $4–$1 up to $250 per contributor in 1998, to $6–$1 up to $175 per contributor in 2007, and to $8-$1 up to $175 or $250 for city-wide positions in 2019.

The public benefits from this matching funds program in a number of ways.  Program participants are motivated to campaign and fundraise within their communities because public matching funds make increases to the value of small contributions from NYC residents. The Brennan Center for Justice and the Campaign Finance Institute found in their 2012 Report, Donor Diversity Through Public Matching Funds, that, “The city’s public financing system gives candidates an incentive to reach out to a broader and more diverse array of constituents to fund their campaigns. In so doing, the city’s public financing system appears to have achieved one of its key goals—strengthening the connections between public officials and their constituents.” When contributions are combined with public matching funds, New Yorkers become the largest “special interest group”, and, are often the biggest source of campaign funds for participating candidates.  The Program makes it possible for candidates of modest means to run competitive campaigns for local office.

Contribution restrictions 

Program participants are prohibited from accepting contributions from unregistered political committees. As part of the registration, political committees agree not to make contributions using corporate funds, closing an important loophole in the corporate contribution ban. A list of registered political committees is published on the CFB's website, to help participants comply with the rules and to provide additional information to the public about the source of campaign contributions.

Program participants can only contribute up to three times the applicable contribution limit to their own campaign. Candidates who wish to entirely self-finance their campaigns can join the Program as a “limited participant”. Limited participants can make unlimited contributions to their own campaign, but do not qualify for any public matching funds, and are subject to the spending limits.

The contribution limits as of 2018 for the 2021 election cycle are as follows:

Spending limits 

Program participants must abide by strictly enforced spending limits, which vary by office. All participants running for the same office are bound by the same spending limit. When participants face a high-spending opponent who has not joined the Program — and thus is not bound by the spending limit — their spending limit may be increased or removed.

Threshold requirements 

Only “matchable" contributions, those from individual New York City residents, are counted toward the threshold. The threshold requirements were designed to ensure that only candidates who can demonstrate a baseline amount of support in the community will receive public dollars for their campaign.Program participants must meet a two-part threshold, which varies by office, before they can receive any public funds:

1. Raise a minimum dollar amount overall
2. Receive a minimum number of matchable contributions

Threshold requirements:

Debate program 

The Campaign Finance Act requires leading candidates for citywide office who participate in the matching funds program to take part in debates before each election. Two debates are held before each primary and general election. An extra debate is held if there is a runoff election. The CFB selects various media, educational, and civic groups to sponsor the debates and broadcast them on television and/or radio citywide. To be eligible for the first primary and/or general election debate for their office, candidates must demonstrate “a minimum level of public support.” To be eligible, candidates must achieve a minimum threshold of funds raised and spent. Additionally, sponsors may work with the CFB to determine other non-partisan, objective and non-discriminatory criteria.

Only candidates deemed “leading contenders” participate in the second debate for the primary and general election.  Leading contenders are determined by additional non-partisan, objective and non-discriminatory criteria determined by the sponsor, in consultation with the CFB.
Debate sponsors may invite candidates who do not join the Campaign Finance Program to participate in any of the debates, as long as they satisfy the same criteria applicable to all participating candidates.

NYC Votes 

Under the banner NYC Votes and with the assistance of the Voter Assistance Advisory Committee (VAAC), the CFB coordinates voter events and programs, distributes voter education materials, and helps NYC residents register to vote.

Since 1989, the CFB has been educating voters about local elections via the NYC Voter Guide, which is mailed to registered voters before each municipal election. The printed Guide is a newsletter containing information about voting, candidate profiles, a list of all candidates on the ballot for each race, and information on anticipated ballot proposals.

An interactive version of the Guide is published on this website, and the video Voter Guide is produced and broadcast for citywide elections. The guide, originally only printed in English and Spanish, has expanded to include Chinese, Korean, and Bengali. In non-municipal election years, the CFB also produces an online Video Guide for state and federal races.

History

Debate requirement 
The Debate Program grew out of public frustration generated during the 1993 mayoral campaign, when Rudy Giuliani and then-Mayor David Dinkins failed to meet in a public debate, even though they accepted more than $3 million in taxpayer funds between them.

Public outrage followed the lack of a public debate. Newspapers, former candidates, public officials, and citizens’ groups united to demand that debates be mandatory for citywide candidates who seek public funds. At the Board's 1993 post-election hearings, then-Mayor-elect Giuliani testified that citywide candidates who qualify for public campaign funds and participate in the Program should be required to “satisfy some of the public frustration with the fact that a million or two million dollars can be given to a candidate [without] a requirement for debate.”

Three years later, Council Speaker Peter Vallone introduced legislation requiring debates for Program participants. The measure passed the full Council on November 14, 1996. Vallone commented that the requirement for debates "will help strengthen and improve the democratic process in New York City."

The Debate Program was first in effect for the 1997 elections, and has been a part of each citywide election since.

Banning corporate contributions 
In 1998, the City Council passed a law increasing the matching rate from $1-to-$1 to $4-to-$1 for candidates who voluntarily agreed to not accept corporate contributions. At the same time, the 1998 Charter Revision Commission proposed a ban on corporate contributions, which was approved by referendum. In 2007, the law extended to include limited liability companies (LLCs) and partnerships.

September 11, 2001 
A primary election was scheduled to be held on September 11, 2001.  Shortly after 9AM, the first plane struck the North Tower of the World Trade Center, just three blocks away from the offices of the CFB. Members of the staff evacuated Lower Manhattan towards safety. The CFB was temporarily relocated to Fordham University's Lincoln Center campus and continued to help many candidates. The primary was rescheduled for September 25, 2001. The Board decided that no adjustments to the contribution and expenditure limits needed to be made, with the exception of the typical “get out the vote” spending on election day.

Doing business restrictions 
Legislation enacted in 2007 called for restrictions on contributions from individuals who have business dealings with the city, and the creation of a database containing the names of those individuals and the entities with which they are associated. The Doing Business Database (“DBDB”) is available to the public, and campaigns can check whether their contributors are listed. This law affects all candidates running for local office (mayor, public advocate, comptroller, borough president, and City Council member) because contributions from individuals listed in the database are subject to lower contribution limits. In addition, for participants in the Campaign Finance Program, these contributions are not eligible to be matched with public funds, nor do they count toward meeting the threshold to receive public funds.

Extension of term limits 
With a year remaining in his second term, on October 2, 2008, Mayor Michael Bloomberg announced that he intended to seek a third term. The Mayor's announcement of his support for a change in the term limits law upended the 2009 elections. After a contentious debate, the City Council voted to extend term limits to three terms for current elected officials. Local Law No. 51 was enacted on November 3, 2008.

Voter Assistance Advisory Committee 
In 2010, New York City voters approved a public referendum to merge the Voter Assistance Commission (VAC) with the CFB to consolidate and strengthen the city's voter outreach and education efforts. VAC staff joined the CFB in January 2011 to form the new Voter Assistance Unit, and takes the lead in the CFB's efforts to promote voter registration, voting, and civic engagement through community outreach and partnerships with public and private organizations.  The Voter Assistance Advisory Committee (VAAC) advises and assists the CFB with its voter engagement efforts. Composed of appointed members, the public advocate, and the executive director of the Board of Elections, VAAC holds public hearings to solicit and hear testimony from members of the public, good government groups, and public officials regarding how to improve voter assistance in New York City, and make recommendations to the CFB to help the agency develop and implement a comprehensive voter engagement plan.

Independent expenditures 
In 2010, independent expenditures disclosure was approved by New York City Voters through a public referendum. Following the public's decision, the CFB established a set of rules to monitor independent expenditures in elections by candidates.

An independent expenditure is one in which no candidate, agent of a candidate, or political committee of a candidate has “authorized, requested, suggested, fostered or cooperated.

Independent spenders have no limits on what may be raised or spent and are required to disclose independent expenditures to the CFB.

Independent spenders are required to report any expenditure that meets the following three criteria:

1. When the amount of the expenditure is $100 or more, and when combined with all other expenditures made by the independent spender concerning a given candidate, reaches $1,000
2. When the expenditure is for the design, production or distribution of covered communications such as TV, radio, and other broadcast communications, paid electoral advertising, and mass mailings.
3. When the communication is either an express advocacy communication or an electioneering communication made within 30 days of a primary or special election or 60 days before a general election.

Controversies

Chairman replacement 
Mayor Dinkins tried to replace Chairman O’Hare with Thomas J. Schwartz, in what some perceived as retribution for determinations the Board during made the 1993 election cycle. The New York Observer said, “It is only with the comet-like regularity that New York’s political establishment produces something that can serve as a model for other municipal governments. Such is the case of the CFB, the fiercely nonpartisan overseer of New York’s voluntary system of public campaign financing for local offices. Unfortunately, the Board may be paying a price for its independence.”

Alan Hevesi payment 
In the spring of 2001, news reports and other mayoral candidates noted that Democratic candidate Alan Hevesi’s spending for certain expenses seemed unusually low compared to the spending of other candidates. Questions were raised about the fee arrangement between the Hevesi campaign and its principal consultants, Morris, Carrick & Guma. the firm provided Hevesi with services far more comprehensive than that of other campaign consultants, yet the cost was less. The Hevesi campaign opted out of maintaining a formal campaign office and instead worked out of the consultants' headquarters. Hank Morris, the owner of the firm was volunteering his own services as a consultant while charging the Hevesi campaign for other work done by his firm.

Campaigns are allowed to use volunteer workers. The Act, however, recognizes limits on what can be considered volunteer services. In an advisory opinion, the Board discussed and concluded that volunteered services by a law firm partner would not be a contribution, if paid for by the law firm however, the service of lawyers, secretaries, paralegals, and others assisting the partner in providing legal services to the candidate would be considered a contribution by the law firm. As a result the Board suspended payment of more than $2.5 million in public funds until the Hevesi campaign included the value of Morris’ services to the Board. Ten days later, after the Hevesi campaign had provided additional information regarding the amounts charged by Morris, Carrick & Guma and agreed to modify its contract with the firm, the Board released $2.6 million in public matching funds to the campaign.

Bloomberg Independence Party contribution 
In 2011, the Board had to consider whether the Michael R. Bloomberg 2009 mayoral campaign committed a violation of the Act by failing to disclose Bloomberg's $1.2 million payments to the Independence party of New York State on October 30, 2009, and November 2, 2009. The payments in question were made to the Independence Party's “housekeeping” account, a loop hole in the State Election Law that provides candidates, corporations, and wealthy individuals with the freedom to make and conceal such a payment in the first place.

The Board voted to close the complaint against Bloomberg on October 18, 2012, saying that the “political expenditures made by Bloomberg with his personal funds to political committees...are presumptively campaign expenditures in furtherance of his campaign.

References

External links 
 
 Campaign Finance Board in the Rules of the City of New York

Government of New York City
1988 establishments in New York City